Flagstar Bank is a Michigan-based bank that has one of the largest residential mortgage servicers in the United States, as well as included in a list of the largest banks in the country. On April 26, 2021, New York Community Bancorp, Inc. (NYCB) issued a press release indicating that they were acquiring Flagstar Bank (FSB) in an all stock strategic merger.

On December 1, 2022, NYCB completed the acquisition of Flagstar Bancorp, Inc., a bank holding company whose FSB was the primary subsidiary.

History
First Security Savings Bank was founded as a federal savings bank in 1987. The chairman of the bank was Thomas J. Hammond. The initial branch focused on funding regional retail and wholesale mortgage operations.

In 1993, FSSB Holding Corporation, a bank holding company was established.

In 1994, the company acquired Security Savings Bank, based in Jackson, Michigan.

In 1996, the company changed its name to Flagstar Bank.

In 1997, the company became a public company via an initial public offering.

In 2001, it moved its stock listing from the NASDAQ to the New York Stock Exchange.

During the financial crisis of 2007-2008, the company raised $1.6 billion in new capital with investments from MP Thrift Investments L.P., the Troubled Asset Relief Program (TARP), and public offerings.

Flagstar effected 1:10 reverse stock splits in 2010 and 2012 to maintain its New York Stock Exchange listing.

The U.S. Department of Treasury sold its preferred stock of Flagstar to private investors in 2013.

In May 2013, Flagstar paid a $110 million settlement to MBIA.

In June 2013, Flagstar reached a $105 million settlement with Assured Guaranty related to its RMBS. Flagstar paid a $93.5-million settlement to Fannie Mae in November 2011, and $8.9 million to Freddie Mac regarding its RMBS mortgage repurchase obligations in December 2013. In September 2014, Flagstar agreed to pay $37.5 million to the Consumer Financial Protection Bureau.

In 2013, the company sold a $1.3 billion commercial loan portfolio to CIT Group.

In August 2016, the bank repaid all of the funds it received under the Troubled Asset Relief Program (TARP).

Flagstar Bank was the jersey sponsor of the Detroit Pistons of the National Basketball Association for the 2017-18 NBA Season.

In March 2018, the bank acquired 8 branches in San Bernardino County, California from Desert Community Bank. The company also acquired a mortgage warehouse loan portfolio from Santander Bank.

In December 2018, Flagstar acquired all 52 branches of Wells Fargo in Indiana, Michigan, and Ohio as well as four in Wisconsin. However, numerous issues plagued Flagstar during the transfer, several of which were caused by its main website experiencing technical glitches. Flagstar waived fees, added staff and published an email address where customers could send concerns to alleviate issues. The bank said most issues were resolved by the end of the week.

In January 2019, the company initiated a dividend.

On March 19, 2023, New York Community Bancorp's Flagstar Bank took on nearly all of Signature Bridge Bank's deposits. Signature Bank was closed by regulators on March 12, 2023. Signature Bank's closure became the third largest bank failure in U.S. history. The agreement did not include about $4 billion linked to Signature's crypto business, which the FDIC said it intended to deal with directly. The 40 former branches of Signature Bank operate under Flagstar Bank as of Monday, March 20, 2023. "Depositors of Signature Bridge Bank, N.A., other than depositors related to the digital banking business, will automatically become depositors of the assuming institution," the FDIC said in a statement. The FDIC said Flagstar would also buy some of Signature's loan portfolios.

Community
In September 2016, Flagstar Bank announced plans for a $10 million, 5-year economic development program for Pontiac, Michigan. The initiative is aimed at helping revitalize the Oakland County city. The program includes $5 million for home mortgages including a customized home loan product for Pontiac residents, $2.5 million for small businesses and start-ups, $1.5 million for the previously announced naming rights of the Flagstar Strand Theatre for the Performing Arts along with an investment of $1 million for financial literacy in the community.

Management
Thomas J. Hammond, founder of Flagstar, served as chairman of Flagstar Bank and Flagstar Bancorp. Mark Hammond became president of the bank in 1995 and CEO in 2002.

In 2009, former CEO of Sovereign Bancorp Joseph P. Campanelli was named chairman, president, and CEO of Flagstar Bank and Flagstar Bancorp.

In 2012, Michael J. Tierney, previously executive vice president and managing director of personal financial services at Flagstar, became president and CEO of the organizations. John D. Lewis, former vice chairman and director of Comerica, was named chairman. Alessandro P. DiNello became president, CEO and director of the organizations in 2013.

Controversy
On February 24, 2012, the United States Department of Justice filed a complaint in the United States District Court for the Southern District of New York against the bank, alleging that it had improperly approved thousands of residential home mortgage loans for government insurance. In February 2013, a U.S. District court in Manhattan found that the bank had materially breached contracts specifying the quality and characteristics of loans to be packaged into the securities.

References

https://myflagstar.flagstar.com/mc/business/marketing/sandro-message-quarterly.html

External links

Banks based in Michigan
Companies based in Troy, Michigan
Companies listed on the New York Stock Exchange
2022 mergers and acquisitions